Townsend County is one of the 141 Cadastral divisions of New South Wales. It is in the south of New South Wales with the Murray River to the south. Deniliquin is located there.

Townsend County was named in honour of the surveyor Thomas S Townsend who was an assistant surveyor to Thomas Livingstone Mitchell.

Parishes within this county
A full list of parishes found within this county; their current LGA and mapping coordinates to the approximate centre of each location is as follows:

References

Counties of New South Wales